Cestas is a commune in the Gironde department in Nouvelle-Aquitaine in southwestern France.

Population

Economy 
Cestas Solar Park was the biggest solar park in Europe when Neoen opened it in December 2015.

See also
Communes of the Gironde department

References

Communes of Gironde